Diploschizia regia is a species of sedge moth in the genus Diploschizia. It was described by John B. Heppner in 1981. It is found in Florida.

The length of the forewings is 2.8 mm. The ground color of the forewings is silvery gray with buff on the apical one third and becoming red brown on the apical center, except for the fuscous borders to all markings. The hindwings are shining fuscous. Adults have been recorded in January.

References

Moths described in 1981
Glyphipterigidae